Wilbur Fisk Lunt (1848 – May 28, 1908) was a Member of the Board of General Appraisers.

Education and career

Lunt was born in 1848 in Maine. He served in the First Maine Cavalry of the United States Army from 1863 to 1865. He served as an Assistant United States Attorney for the District of Maine from 1881 to 1885.

Federal judicial service

Lunt was nominated by President Benjamin Harrison on January 21, 1891, to a seat on the Board of General Appraisers vacated by Joseph Lewis Stackpole. He was confirmed by the United States Senate on January 27, 1891, and received his commission on January 28, 1891. His service terminated on May 28, 1908, due to his death in New York City, New York. He was succeeded by Roy Chamberlain.

References

Sources
 

1848 births
1908 deaths
People from Maine
Members of the Board of General Appraisers
United States Article I federal judges appointed by Benjamin Harrison
19th-century American judges
Date of birth unknown